Zaireichthys is a genus of loach catfishes (order Siluriformes) of the family Amphiliidae.

Distribution
Zaireichthys species are found in Africa.

Description
Zaireichthys species are quite small ranging from 2.1 cm (P. lacustris) to 3.9 cm (P. flavomaculatus) in length.

Species 
There are currently 18 described species in this genus:
 Zaireichthys brevis (Boulenger, 1915)
 Zaireichthys camerunensis (Daget & Stauch, 1963)
 Zaireichthys compactus Seegers, 2008
 Zaireichthys conspicuus Eccles, Tweddle & P. H. Skelton, 2011
 Zaireichthys dorae (Poll, 1967) (Chobe sand catlet)
 Zaireichthys flavomaculatus (Pellegrin, 1926)
 Zaireichthys heterurus T. R. Roberts, 2003
 Zaireichthys kafuensis Eccles, Tweddle & P. H. Skelton, 2011
 Zaireichthys kavangoensis Eccles, Tweddle & P. H. Skelton, 2011
 Zaireichthys kunenensis Eccles, Tweddle & P. H. Skelton, 2011
 Zaireichthys lacustris Eccles, Tweddle & P. H. Skelton, 2011
 Zaireichthys mandevillei (Poll, 1959)
 Zaireichthys maravensis Eccles, Tweddle & P. H. Skelton, 2011
 Zaireichthys monomotapa Eccles, Tweddle & P. H. Skelton, 2011
 Zaireichthys pallidus Eccles, Tweddle & P. H. Skelton, 2011
 Zaireichthys rotundiceps (Hilgendorf, 1905) (Spotted sand catlet)
 Zaireichthys wamiensis (Seegers, 1989)
 Zaireichthys zonatus T. R. Roberts, 1967

References

Amphiliidae
Fish of Africa
Catfish genera
Taxa named by Tyson R. Roberts
Freshwater fish genera